Iski Topi Uske Sarr (transl. My Hat, Your Head) is a 1998 Indian Bollywood film directed by Raju Mavani and produced by Nitin Mavani. It stars Sharad Kapoor, Mukul Dev and Divya Dutta in pivotal roles.

Cast
 Sharad Kapoor as Jai Malhotra
 Mukul Dev as Raj
 Divya Dutta as Milli
 Aruna Irani as Gayetri
 Johnny Lever as Gabbar Singh / Mogamba / John Lobo
 Sudhir as Joseph
 Sunny Deol in a cameo as Bhangra dancer
 Razak Khan as Akubhai Pakuli
 Prem Chopra as Udham Singh
 Arun Bakshi as Mohamed
 Tina as Radha
 Rubina as Barkha

Soundtrack

References

External links
 

1990s Hindi-language films
1998 films
Films scored by Anu Malik